The Ecological Movement of Romania (MER) was a political party in Romania.

History
Following the overthrow of the Communist regime in Romania, the MER was formed as a front for the post-Ceaușescu regime in an effort to attract the support of environmentalists. It received 2.6% of the Chamber of Deputies vote in the 1990 general elections, winning 12 seats. It also received 2.6% of the Senate vote, winning one seat. In December 1990 the party joined the National Convention for the Establishment of Reform and Democracy (CDR), a coalition opposing the National Salvation Front (FSN) government. The collapse of the coalition in January 1992 led to the party failing to win a seat in the 1992 general elections; although its vote share was reduced only marginally to 2.3% it lost all its seats.

It contested the 1996 elections as part of the National Union of the Centre alliance, alongside the Romanian Democratic Agrarian Party (PDAR) and the Humanist Party (PC). However, the alliance received only 0.9% of the vote, failing to win a seat.

Electoral history

Legislative elections

References

Defunct political parties in Romania